Stauntonia latifolia (syn. Holboellia latifolia Wall.) is a perennial ornamental plant in the family Lardizabalaceae.

References

External links
Holboellia latifolia

Lardizabalaceae